Route 77, or Highway 77, may refer to:

International
 Asian Highway 77
 European route E77

Afghanistan
Kabul-Herat Highway (A77)

Australia
 Bowen Developmental Road - Queensland State Route 77

Canada
 British Columbia Highway 77
 Manitoba Highway 77
 Ontario Highway 77

India
National Highway 77 (India)

Iran 
Road 77

Israel
Highway 77 (Israel)

Malaysia
 Malaysia Federal Route 77

Korea, South
 National Route 77

New Zealand
 New Zealand State Highway 77

Philippines
 N77 highway (Philippines)

United Arab Emirates
 E 77, also known as the Dubai-Al Habab Road

United States
 Interstate 77
 U.S. Route 77
 Alabama State Route 77
 Arizona State Route 77
 Arkansas Highway 77
 California State Route 77
 Connecticut Route 77
 Florida State Road 77
 Georgia State Route 77
 Idaho State Highway 77
 Illinois Route 77 (former)
 Iowa Highway 77 (former)
 Kentucky Route 77
 Louisiana Highway 77
 Maine State Route 77
 Maryland Route 77
 M-77 (Michigan highway)
 Minnesota State Highway 77
 Missouri Route 77
 Missouri Route 77 (1929) (former)
 Montana Highway 77
 Nebraska Highway 77 (former)
 Nebraska Highway 77B (former)
 Nevada State Route 77 (former)
 New Hampshire Route 77
 New Jersey Route 77
 County Route 77 (Bergen County, New Jersey)
 County Route 77 (Ocean County, New Jersey)
 New Mexico State Road 77
 New York State Route 77
 County Route 77 (Cattaraugus County, New York)
 County Route 77 (Chautauqua County, New York)
 County Route 77 (Dutchess County, New York)
 County Route 77 (Jefferson County, New York)
 County Route 77 (Madison County, New York)
 County Route 77 (Montgomery County, New York)
 County Route 77 (Niagara County, New York)
 County Route 77 (Onondaga County, New York)
 County Route 77 (Orange County, New York)
 County Route 77 (Rensselaer County, New York)
 County Route 77 (Suffolk County, New York)
 County Route 77B (Suffolk County, New York)
 County Route 77 (Ulster County, New York)
 County Route 77 (Washington County, New York)
 North Carolina Highway 77
 Ohio State Route 77 (1923) (former)
 Oklahoma State Highway 77 (former)
 Oklahoma State Highway 77C (former and current highway)
 Oklahoma State Highway 77D
 Oklahoma State Highway 77H
 Oklahoma State Highway 77S
 Pennsylvania Route 77
 Rhode Island Route 77
 Tennessee State Route 77
 Texas State Highway 77
 Texas State Highway Loop 77 (former)
 Texas State Highway Spur 77
 Farm to Market Road 77 (Texas)
 Utah State Route 77
 Virginia State Route 77 (former)
 West Virginia Route 77 (1920s) (former)
 Wisconsin Highway 77
 Wyoming Highway 77

See also
List of highways numbered 77A
A77